Adamec (feminine: Adamcová) is a surname of Czech and Slovak origin. It comes from the personal name Adam and the Czech/Slovak suffix -ec. Pronounced "a-da-mets", it is occasionally Germanized as Adametz.

Notable people with the surname include:

 Austin Adamec (born 1988), American musician
 Jiří Adamec (born 1982), Czech footballer
 Joseph Victor Adamec (1935–2019), American Roman Catholic bishop
 Jozef Adamec (1942–2018), Slovak footballer
 Ladislav Adamec (1926–2007), Czechoslovak prime minister
 Leopold Adametz (1861-1941), Czech-born Austrian zoologist
 Luboš Adamec (born 1959), Czech sport shooter
 Ludwig W. Adamec (1924–2019), American academic and historian
 Petr Adamec (born 1960), Czech swimmer
 Quido Adamec (1924–2007), Czech ice hockey referee
 Zdeněk Adamec (born 1956), Czechoslovak javelin thrower

See also
 
 Adamiec, Polish equivalent of Adamec

References

Czech-language surnames
Slovak-language surnames